Jiangnan Shipyard is a historic shipyard in Shanghai, China. The shipyard has been state-owned since its founding in 1865 and is now operated as Jiangnan Shipyard (Group) Co. Ltd.

Before 2009, the company was south of central Shanghai at 2 Gaoxing Road. In 2009, the shipyard was moved to Changxing Island, in the mouth of the Yangtze River to the north of urban Shanghai..

The shipyard builds, repairs and converts both civilian and military ships. Other activities include the manufacture of machinery and electrical equipment, pressure vessels and steel works for various land-based products.

Ship building

The shipyard main production is: liquefied gas carriers, car carriers, crude oil tankers, Panamax bulk carriers, Handymax bulk carriers, Lake suitable bulk carriers, multi-purpose cargo ships, and fast feeder container ships. The shipyard recently delivered 23,000 TEU LNG-fueled containership the CMA CGM Champs Elysées, but there was a delay of at least 10 months.

See also
Chinese aircraft carrier programme
Foochow Arsenal
Great Hsi-Ku Arsenal
Hanyang Arsenal
Naval history of China
Self-Strengthening Movement
Taiyuan Arsenal

References

External links
  
  
 listing by GlobalSecurity.org
 Collection of photos of ships built by Jiangnan Shipyard

Shipbuilding companies of China
Manufacturing companies based in Shanghai
Manufacturing companies established in 1865
Firearm manufacturers of China
Shipyards of China
Chinese companies established in 1865